New Jerusalem is a concept in Christianity and other religions. 

New Jerusalem may also refer to:

Religion
Church of the New Jerusalem, any of several Christian denominations
Zion (Latter Day Saints), the New Jerusalem in that movement

Media
New Jerusalem (film), 2011
11Q18 New Jerusalem, a Dead Sea Scroll
New Jerusalem Bible, a Catholic translation of the Bible
The New Jerusalem (Chesterton book)
"And did those feet in ancient time", a poem by William Blake with the alternate title "The New Jerusalem"
The New Jerusalem (Wilby), a brass band piece
New Jerusalem (play), by David Ives

Places
Neu-Jerusalem, a neighbourhood in Berlin 
New Jerusalem, California (disambiguation)
New Jerusalem, Ohio, an unincorporated community
New Jerusalem Airport, in California
New Jerusalem Monastery, in Russia
New Jerusalem theater, in Pernambuco, Brazil
New Jerusalem, a former name of the Polish town Góra Kalwaria
Nueva Jerusalén, a short-lived Spanish settlement in the north of Vanuatu
Žemaičių Kalvarija, Lithuania, known in the 17th century as "New Jerusalem"

See also
"Let the River Run", a song by Carly Simon including the lyric "the New Jerusalem"